Brillevast is a commune in the Manche department in Normandy in northwestern France.

Population

See also
Communes of the Manche department

References

Communes of Manche